Francis Edward Parnell Baker (July 11, 1884 – April 28, 1959) was a Canadian professional ice hockey player. He played with the Toronto Blueshirts of the National Hockey Association. Baker played most of his hockey career for teams in Saskatchewan leagues, both professional and amateur.

Career
Baker is known to have played for the Saskatoon Hockey Club of the Saskatchewan Senior League in 1904–05. In 1908, he played for the Saskatoon Strathconas of the Saskatchewan Professional Hockey League (SPHL). He played four seasons in the SPHL with various Saskatoon teams. Baker played four games for the Toronto Blueshirts of the NHA in the 1914–15 season, the season after they won the Stanley Cup. He was reinstated as an amateur and played ice hockey in the Saskatchewan Senior League from 1916 to 1921. He is known to have played four games for the Saskatoon Empires of the North Saskatchewan Season Hockey League in the 1925–21 season.

References

1884 births
1959 deaths
Canadian ice hockey players
Ice hockey people from Ontario
People from Stratford, Ontario
Toronto Blueshirts players